Alonzo Craig Shuford (March 1, 1858 – February 8, 1933) was a U.S. Representative from North Carolina.

Born on a farm near Newton, North Carolina, Shuford attended the common schools and Newton College.
He engaged in agricultural pursuits.
Joined the Farmers Alliance in 1889 and was a county and district lecturer.
He served as delegate to the labor conference at St. Louis, Missouri, in February 1892.
He was also a delegate to the Populist convention at Omaha, Nebraska, in July 1892.

Shuford was elected vice president of the State Alliance in 1894.

Shuford was elected as a Populist to the Fifty-fourth and Fifty-fifth Congresses (March 4, 1895 – March 3, 1899).
He was an unsuccessful candidate for renomination in 1898.
He resumed agricultural pursuits near Newton, North Carolina.
He served as presidential elector on the Progressive ticket in 1924.
He retired from active business pursuits in 1928 and moved to Chapel Hill, North Carolina, where he died on February 8, 1933.
He was interred in Chapel Hill Cemetery.

Sources

External links

 

1858 births
1933 deaths
North Carolina Populists
People from Newton, North Carolina
People's Party members of the United States House of Representatives from North Carolina
People from Chapel Hill, North Carolina
Members of the United States House of Representatives from North Carolina